Miargyrite is a mineral, a sulfide of silver and antimony with the formula AgSbS2. It is a dimorph of cuboargyrite. Originally discovered in the Freiberg district of Germany in 1824, it has subsequently been found in many places where silver is mined. It usually occurs in low temperature hydrothermal deposits. and forms black metallic crystals which may show a dark red internal reflection. The streak is also red.

Miargyrite is named from the Greek meyon, "smaller" and argyros, "silver," as its silver content is lower than most silver sulfides.

References 

Silver minerals
Antimony minerals
Sulfosalt minerals
Monoclinic minerals
Minerals in space group 15